Upside Down or Upsidedown may refer to:

Arts, entertainment, and media

Films
 Upside Down (1919 film), a 1919 American silent film
 Upside Down (2007 film), a 2007 film directed by Igor Ivanov Izi
 Upside Down (2012 film), a 2012 Canadian-French film starring Jim Sturgess and Kirsten Dunst
 Upside Down (2015 film), a 2015 South Korean film
 Upside Down: The Creation Records Story, a 2010 film by Danny O'Connor

Music

Groups
 Upside Down (group), a British boyband later reformed as Orange Orange
 The Upsidedown, an American alt-rock band

Albums
 Upside Down (Thomas Leeb album), 2006
 Upside Down (Set It Off album), 2016
 Up Side Down, a 1996 album by Shoko Inoue

Songs
 "Upside Down" (Diana Ross song), 1980
 "Upside Down" (The Jesus and Mary Chain song), 1984
"Upside Down" (A-Teens song), 2000
 "Upside Down" (Paloma Faith song), 2009
 "Upside Down" (Jack Johnson song), 2006
 "Upside Down", a 1973 song by Hawkwind from Space Ritual
 "Upside Down", a 1986 song by Two Minds Crack from The Victory Parade
 "Upside Down", a 1991 song by Tori Amos from Silent All These Years
 "Upside-Down", a 1992 song by Yo La Tengo from May I Sing with Me
 "Upside Down", a 1999 song by Elf Power from Come On
 "Upside Down", a 2000 song by ZOEgirl from ZOEgirl 
"Upside Down", a 2003 song by Alphaville from CrazyShow
 "Upside Down", a 2003 song by Barenaked Ladies from Everything to Everyone
 "Upside Down", a 2006 song by Jakalope from Born 4
 "Upside Down", a 2009 song by Snoop Dogg from Malice n Wonderland
 "Upsidedown", a 2012 song by Lacuna Coil from Dark Adrenaline
 "Upside Down", a 2013 song by Ross Lynch from Austin & Ally: Turn It Up
 "Upside Down", a 2015 song by Dean Brody from Gypsy Road
 "Upside Down", a 2018 song by The Story So Far from Proper Dose
 "Upside Down", a 2020 song by Royce da 5'9" from The Allegory

Television
 "Chapter Eight: The Upside Down", the season 1 finale episode of Stranger Things
 The Upside Down Show, an Australian children's TV show

Other uses in arts, entertainment, and media
 Upside Down (book), a 1998 book by Eduardo Galeano
 Upside Down, also known as the Chinese Water Torture Cell, an escape routine by Harry Houdini
 The Upside Down, an alternate reality that is a key plot element of the television show Stranger Things

Other uses
 Upside-down (loan) or negative equity or being under water, owing more on a loan than the value of the asset that the loan was used to purchase

See also
 Downside Up, a box set by Siouxsie and the Banshees
 Inverted question and exclamation marks
 Point reflection
 Southern Hemisphere
 The Upside of Down (disambiguation)
 Transformation of text
Upside-down cake